The following is a list of events affecting American television in 2014. Events listed include television show debuts, finales, and cancellations; channel launches, closures, and rebrandings; stations changing or adding their network affiliations; and information about changes of ownership of channels or stations, controversies and carriage disputes.

Events

January

February

March

April

May

June

July

August

September

October

November

December

Programs

Debuts

These shows premiered during 2014.

Made-for-TV movies, television specials, and miniseries

Programs changing networks

The following shows aired new episodes on a different network than previous first-run episodes.

Returning this year
The following returned with new episodes after a previous cancellation or ended run:

Milestone episodes

Entering syndication this year
A list of programs (current or canceled) that have accumulated enough episodes (between 65 and 100) or seasons (3 or more) to be eligible for off-network syndication and/or basic cable runs.

Ending this year

Television stations

Sign-ons

Changes of network affiliation
The following is a list of television stations that have made noteworthy network affiliation changes in 2014.

Sign-offs

Deaths

See also
 2014 in the United States
 List of American films of 2014

References

External links 
List of 2014 American television series at IMDb

 
2014